The 1933–34 Washington Huskies men's basketball team represented the University of Washington for the  NCAA college basketball season. Led by fourteenth-year head coach Hec Edmundson, the Huskies were members of the Pacific Coast Conference and played their home games on campus at the UW Pavilion in Seattle, Washington.

They traveled to Los Angeles for the PCC championship series against USC, the winner of the Southern division. After dropping the first game, Washington won the next two to take the conference 

The National Invitation Tournament (NIT) debuted in 1938, and the NCAA tournament in 1939.

Postseason results

|-
!colspan=6 style=| Pacific Coast Conference Playoff Series

References

External links
Sports Reference – Washington Huskies: 1933–34 basketball season
Washington Huskies men's basketball media guide (2009–10) – History

Washington Huskies men's basketball seasons
Washington Huskies
Washington
Washington